Gilbert Fillion (27 July 1940 in Sainte-Anne-de-Chicoutimi, Quebec – 27 May 2007 in Quebec City, Quebec) was a member of the House of Commons of Canada from 1993 to 1997. He was a professor by career.

He was elected in the Chicoutimi electoral district under the Bloc Québécois party in the 1993 federal election, thus serving in the 35th Canadian Parliament. He left Canadian politics after being defeated by Progressive Conservative candidate André Harvey in the 1997 federal election.

His son, Jeff Fillion, is a radio broadcaster.

He died of lung cancer on 27 May 2007 in Quebec City.

External links
 

1940 births
2007 deaths
Bloc Québécois MPs
Members of the House of Commons of Canada from Quebec
Politicians from Saguenay, Quebec